This is a list of 111 species in the genus Margarinotus.

Margarinotus species

References